Aleksander Douglas de Faria, better known as Aleks or Aleksander (born February 20, 1991) is a Brazilian goalkeeper.

Career

Career statistics
(Correct )

Honours

National team
South American Youth Championship: 2011
FIFA U-20 World Cup: 2011

Contract
 Avaí

References

External links
Avaí 

1991 births
Footballers from Curitiba
Living people
Brazilian footballers
Brazil under-20 international footballers
Brazil youth international footballers
Association football goalkeepers
Grêmio Foot-Ball Porto Alegrense players
Avaí FC players
Clube Recreativo e Atlético Catalano players
Mirassol Futebol Clube players
Clube Atlético Tricordiano players
Campeonato Brasileiro Série A players
Campeonato Brasileiro Série C players